Daniel Marx (born October 7, 1995) is a former American football fullback. He played college football at Stanford. He led Stanford to single-game rushing totals of 350-plus yards on three occasions over his final two seasons, blocking for Heisman runner-ups Christian McCaffrey and Bryce Love. He signed with the Atlanta Falcons as an undrafted free agent in 2018.

Professional career

Atlanta Falcons
Marx signed with the Atlanta Falcons as an undrafted free agent on May 1, 2018. He was waived on July 30, 2018.

Seattle Seahawks
On August 25, 2018, Marx was signed by the Seattle Seahawks. He was waived on September 1, 2018.

San Diego Fleet
On September 14, 2018, Marx signed with San Diego Fleet of the Alliance of American Football, but retired in January 2019.

References

External links
Stanford Cardinal bio

1995 births
Living people
American football fullbacks
Atlanta Falcons players
San Diego Fleet players
Seattle Seahawks players
Sportspeople from Mission Viejo, California
Stanford Cardinal football players